Evin Çiçek: journalist, investigative reporter, author, poet.

Also known as Evin Aydar, Aydar was the last name of her former husband.

She was born in Koçgiri Kamilava-Maciran-Çît ( İmranlı ) in 1961. After the declaration of Republic of Turkey, borough of Koçgiri was divided by the borders of three different provinces: Sêwaz, Erzincan, Gumusxane.

Evin Çiçek's village, Çime(a)n (which means plateau in Kurdish) or "Yoncabayırı" in Turkish, is located on the skirts of Çengeli Mountain. This mountain is considered as sacred by the local people because of the Polytheistic religion. All features of Kurdish peculiar religious belief are visible in the region. Locals are members of Milan family.

Evin Çiçek starts her education life in the primary school of her village. After first grade, she continued her studies in Kılıç Ali Paşa primary school in Istanbul later on graduated from Aksaray Oruçgazi primary school. In 1974 she started studying at Cibali Kız Lisesi and graduated from the same high school in 1980. In 1981 she went to Marmara University the Faculty of economics and administration and graduated in public administration in 1985.

After she graduated from high school in 1980, in order to investigate the working conditions of working class she had worked in sewing workshops. She also worked during her University years. In 1988, she started to work as journalist. The same year she published a report about the graves at the“Kasaplar deresi (Butchers Creek)”. She has been working in the fields of research, journalism and authorship since then.

In the year 1994 she left Turkey and continued her studies at Fribourg University in Switzerland where she received bachelor, master, doctorate degrees in administration / economics, political sociology, geopolitics

Politics 
She has started to be interested in politics since her secondary school years. She experienced the persecutions of 12 September military coup. On 9 February 1981, she was detained in the KAWA case. She was arrested after two months of torture. After her imprisonment in Selimiye Barracks and Metris Prison, in September 1981 she got evacuated. In 1986, she moves to Siirt where she took a part in the management of People’s Labor Party (HEP) and Democracy Party (DEP).

Human rights advocacy 
In 1988, she became a member of the Board of Directors of the Siirt Branch of the Human Rights Association. Later she became the branch president in 1990. In 1990 she was awarded with human rights award by Human Right Watch (HRW).

Personal life 
She married Zübeyir Aydar in 1983. She is the mother of two sons. In 1993 she separated from her husband, and they officially divorced in 1999.

Exile 
In 1993, she went to PKK’s Zele Camp and had lived there for three and a half months in order to publish two of her investigations; “ war and human" and "Law in PKK". Upon government's awareness of her visit to Zele, the prosecutor's office in Ankara started to collect evidence in order to judge her. Avoid to be taken into custody for a second time and stay in prison for a long time, she left Turkey in November 1993 with her two sons. She was granted with the right of asylum by Switzerland.

Works 
Unpublished
 Türk Ordusu ve devlet yönetme geleneği/güç – Turkish military and government tradition / Power
 Enverizm/Kemalizm ve Kürdler. I, II; III   - Enverism/Kemalism and Kurds . I, II, III
 Ateş altında hukuk  - Law under the fire
 Kürdler ve göçertmeler, insansızlaştırma -  Kurds and collapses, dehumanisation
 Diaspora da Kürd gençliği – Kurdish youth in the diaspora

Published
 Sevgiye sınır koyamazsınız (1998, Medya yayınları, İsveç )  - You can't set limit to Love
 Koçgiri ulusal kurtuluş hareketi (1999, APEC, İsveç ) – Koçgiri national liberation movement
 Ararat yolcuları, insan ticareti, göç, mültecilik (2005, Peri, İstanbul) – Passengers of Ararat, Human trafficking, migration, refuge
 Tutkular ve tutsaklar (2000, Peri, İstanbul) – Passions and captives
 Kadınca yargılama (2006, Peri, İstanbul) – Women's trial

Poetry
 Awaza Serpêhatiyan I, II, III (2004, Peri, İstanbul)
 Other unpublished poetry books

References 

 A report about freedom of speech and eviction of Evin Çiçek
 interview with Evin Çiçek

Turkish people of Kurdish descent
Kurdish writers
Kurdish women writers
Kurdish journalists
Kurdish women journalists
Kurdish poets
Kurdish women poets
Turkish writers
Turkish women writers
Turkish journalists
Turkish women journalists
Turkish poets
Turkish women poets
Living people
1961 births